Vreeland Avenue was railroad station in Paterson, New Jersey served by the New York, Susquehanna and Western Railroad (NYS&W). until 1966. Service by the New Jersey Midland, a predecessor to the NYS&W, had begun in 1873. The station house dates to 1949. Other 
extant station buildings from the New Jersey Midland/NYSW can be found at Wortendyke, Butler, and Newfoundland, among other places.

The location in the People's Park neighborhood is potential station of New Jersey Transit Rail Operations proposed Passaic–Bergen–Hudson Transit Project.

See also
 NYSW (passenger 1939-1966) map
 Operating Passenger Railroad Stations Thematic Resource (New Jersey)

References

External links

Railway stations in the United States opened in 1873
Railway stations closed in 1966
Transportation in Paterson, New Jersey
Former New York, Susquehanna and Western Railway stations
Former railway stations in New Jersey
Railway stations in Passaic County, New Jersey
Proposed NJ Transit rail stations
1966 disestablishments in New Jersey